On the night of 24 August 2004, explosive devices were detonated on board two domestic passenger flights that had taken off from Domodedovo International Airport in Moscow, Russia, causing the destruction of both aircraft and the loss of all 90 people on board them.

Subsequent investigations concluded that two Chechen female suicide bombers were responsible for the bombings, which were also later claimed by the leader of the Chechen insurgency.

Flights

Volga-AviaExpress Flight 1303
The first to crash was Volga-AviaExpress Flight 1303, a Tu-134 aircraft, registered RA-65080, which had been in service since 1977. The plane was flying from Moscow to Volgograd. It left Domodedovo International Airport at 22:30 on 24 August 2004. The remains of the aircraft were found on the ground several hours later. Thirty-four passengers and 9 crew members were on board the plane. All of them died in the crash. The flight recorders were recovered from the crash site. Both recorders stopped recording within 2–3 seconds of this event. This was followed by the separation of the fuselage at that location an undetermined amount of time afterward.

Siberia Airlines Flight 1047
Just minutes after the first crash, Siberia Airlines Flight 1047, which had left Domodedovo International Airport at 21:35 on 24 August 2004, disappeared from the radar screens and crashed. The Tu-154 aircraft, registered RA-85556, which had been in service since 1982, was flying from Moscow to Sochi. According to an unnamed government source of the Russian news agency Interfax, the plane had broadcast a hijack warning while flying over Rostov Oblast at 22:59. However, it was later determined that this was the aircraft's Emergency Locator Transmitter (ELT), and that the crew of flight 1047 were not aware of any danger prior to the aircraft disappearing from radar. The plane disappeared from radar screens shortly after that and crashed. 38 passengers and 8 crew members were on board the plane, and there were no survivors after the crash. The debris of the aircraft was found on the morning of 25 August 2004,  from the work settlement of Gluboky in Kamensky District of Rostov Oblast. The blast resulted in a rapid decompression of the cabin, damage to the elevator and rudder controls, a substantial loss of electrical power, and severe damage to the fuselage and tail components. The ELT was triggered half a second after the event, either by a crew member or automatically. The data recorder stopped working shortly after the explosion, but the cockpit voice recorder continued recording until impact with the ground, during which most of the crew discussions were about the loss of cabin pressure and electrical systems. The crew were caught completely off guard by the event, and there is no evidence that the crew was aware of the detonation of an explosive device on board.

Responsibility 
The two almost simultaneous crashes caused speculations about terrorism. President Vladimir Putin immediately ordered the Federal Security Service (FSB) to investigate the crashes. On 28 August 2004, the FSB had found traces of the explosive RDX in the remains of both planes. Itar-Tass news agency reported on 30 August 2004, "without a shadow of a doubt, the FSB security service said that 'both airplanes were blown up as a result of a terrorist attack'". A little known group called the Islambouli Brigades claimed responsibility; the truth of those claims remains uncertain. The Islambouli Brigades have also claimed that five of their members were on each plane; experts are skeptical about the possibility of (and the need for) so many terrorists on board.

The subsequent investigation found that the bombs were triggered by two female Chechen suicide bombers, Grozny residents Satsita Dzhebirkhanova (Siberia Airlines Flight 1047) and Amanta Nagayeva (Volga-AviaExpress Flight 1303). Nagayeva's brother had disappeared three years earlier and the family believed he was abducted by Russian forces. Chechen field commander Shamil Basayev took responsibility for the bombings in an open letter published on the Chechen separatists' websites on 17 September 2004. He claimed that the aircraft bombings cost him US$4,000 in total. He has also denied the Islambouli Brigade's claims.

The bombings followed the Moscow metro bombing which left 41 people dead in February 2004 and preceded other deadly attacks in Russia soon afterwards: on 31 August 2004 a bomb killed 10 at a Moscow subway station, and then the Beslan hostage crisis began on 1 September 2004 which would leave over 335 people dead, many of them children.

Arrests and trials 
On 24 August 2004, the bombers were stopped in the airport by police captain Mikhail Artamonov to be searched for weapons and for identification. They were accompanied by two male Chechens. The four of them arrived in Moscow on a flight from Makhachkala. According to the prosecution, Artamonov did not search them, and subsequently was charged with criminal negligence. On 30 June 2005, he was convicted of negligence and sentenced to seven years of imprisonment. An appeal was made against the sentence, and the court subsequently reduced the term to six years.

According to investigators, ticket seller Armen Aratyunyan was bribed approximately €140 to sell tickets to the two women without obtaining their correct IDs. Aratyunyan also helped Dzhebirkhanova to bribe the ticket-checking clerk, Nikolai Korenkov, with €25 to get on board without the proper IDs. On 15 April 2005, Aratyunyan and Korenkov were convicted of giving and taking bribes. They were sentenced to 1.5 years in a settlement colony (settlement colony convicts have more rights and privileges than people in standard colonies).

Twenty-one relatives of the deceased passengers filed a civil suit against the security company responsible for checking the passengers, ZAO East-Line Aviation Security. They demanded 3,000,000 rubles (approximately €86,600 or US$115,000) in damages per victim. The trial in that case started in Volgograd on 22 February 2007. The security company claimed that it was not liable for damages, but the persons who organized the bombings were. The court handling the civil case sent a request to the prosecutor's office to get an update on the criminal investigation. The investigation was suspended indefinitely on 26 September 2006. According to the investigator who was handling the case, the people helping the suicide bombers at the airport were killed in Chechnya, the people responsible for planning the bombings were not identified (Shamil Basayev, who claimed responsibility for organizing the bombings, was also killed), and consequently the investigation was suspended due to lack of suspects. That civil case was still in court . Other passengers' relatives also sued the Russian Ministry of Internal Affairs, S7 Airlines and two insurance companies, Ingosstrakh and OAO Afes for damages (none of the defendants acknowledge any liability). On 21 October 2007, the court in the latter case found S7 Airlines liable for damages and ruled they should pay the relative of the victim in question 250,000 rubles (approximately €7,000), which was about 10% of what the plaintiffs asked for. S7's initial appeal was rejected by the court on 27 May 2008. A new S7 appeal was successful in April 2009 and the verdict was rejected. Relatives of the passenger appealed against the decision, but their appeal was dismissed in August 2009. They plan to appeal to a higher court.

References

External links 

 S7 Airlines Statement about the bombing
  Report. Interstate Aviation Committee.
  Выводы Государственной комиссии по установлению причин катастроф воздушных судов ТУ-154 и ТУ-134, произошедших 24.08.2004 – Ministry of Transport
 Investigators probe Russia crashes (CNN).
 Traces of explosives found (CNN).
 'Terrorist' Bombs Brought Down Russian Planes (Reuters, 30 August 2004).

21st-century mass murder in Russia
Attacks in Russia in 2004
Operations of the Second Chechen War
Airliner bombings
Aviation accidents and incidents in Russia
Aviation accidents and incidents in 2004
Islamic terrorism in Russia
Mass murder in 2004
Suicide bombing in the Chechen wars
Terrorist incidents in Russia in 2004
Aircraft
Accidents and incidents involving the Tupolev Tu-134
Accidents and incidents involving the Tupolev Tu-154
August 2004 events in Russia